Pentol is a type of snack which can be found in Indonesia - it's a type of meatballs with flour, usually given with peanut sauce or tomato sauce, soy sauce and sambal.

Pentol is often found, especially in East Java, Central Java and Yogyakarta. Pentol is usually sold per seed at a price according to the bag, starting from 200 rupiah per seed to 1000 rupiah depending on the size and contents of the pentol, mixed with peanut sauce or tomato sauce and soy sauce. The pentol traders usually sell them by using a cart, motorbike, or bicycle, even by walking and moving depending on the whereabouts of the buyer. The price is cheap and the taste is good and filling is one of the reasons the business of selling pentol is popular in people, especially in rural areas.

See also
 List of meatball dishes

References

Indonesian cuisine
Meatballs